Laekvere Parish was a rural municipality of Estonia, in Lääne-Viru County. It had a population of 1837 (2006) and an area of 352.42 km2.

Populated places
Laekvere Parish had 1 small borough and 18 villages.

 Small borough
Laekvere

 Villages
Alekvere (26), Arukse (27), Ilistvere (5), Kaasiksaare (37), Kellavere (8), Luusika (0), Moora (141), Muuga (276), Paasvere (209), Padu (49), Rahkla (172), Rajaküla (78), Rohu (68), Salutaguse (29), Sirevere (22), Sootaguse (2), Vassivere (36), Venevere (169).

References

This article includes content from the Estonian Wikipedia article Laekvere vald.

External links